Hurtig is a Swedish surname.

Geographical distribution
As of 2014, 48.7% of all known bearers of the surname Hurtig were residents of Sweden (frequency 1:5,620), 18.5% of the United States (1:543,235), 14.4% of Germany (1:154,286), 7.6% of Finland (1:19,988), 4.1% of Canada (1:252,041), 1.2% of Poland (1:844,639) and 1.0% of Norway (1:138,982).

In Sweden, the frequency of the surname was higher than national average (1:5,620) in the following counties:
 1. Dalarna County (1:1,794)
 2. Jämtland County (1:2,174)
 3. Örebro County (1:2,971)
 4. Gävleborg County (1:3,836)
 5. Södermanland County (1:3,878)
 6. Uppsala County (1:4,727)
 7. Västra Götaland County (1:4,979)
 8. Norrbotten County (1:5,016)
 9. Skåne County (1:5,115)

In Finland, the frequency of the surname was higher than national average (1:19,988) in the following regions:
 1. Lapland (1:1,203)
 2. Tavastia Proper (1:11,143)
 3. North Ostrobothnia (1:11,724)
 4. Ostrobothnia (1:12,414)

People
Catarina Hurtig (born 1975), Swedish journalist
Lina Hurtig (born 1995), Swedish footballer
Mel Hurtig (1932–2016), Canadian publisher, writer and politician
Ralph Hurtig (1932–2017), Swedish rower

References

Swedish-language surnames